The 1977 Baylor Bears football team represented the Baylor University in the 1977 NCAA Division I football season. The Bears finished the season sixth in the Southwest Conference.

Schedule

References

Baylor
Baylor Bears football seasons
Baylor Bears football